Jalan Prof. Khoo Kay Kim, previously known as Jalan Semangat is a major road in Petaling Jaya city, Selangor, Malaysia. This road was renamed after Tan Sri Prof. Khoo Kay Kim, who had died in 2019 by Sultan of Selangor, Sultan Sharafuddin Idris Shah in July 2019, to honour the late Khoo's contributions during his life.

Landmarks
British American Tobacco factory
Bulatan Rothmans roundabout
Tun Abdul Aziz Mosque (Masjid Bulat)
Jaya Supermarket 
Jaya 33

Development
The Rothmans Roundabout or Bulatan Rothmans was named after the tobacco company Rothmans of Pall Mall (Malaysia) Berhad (now British American Tobacco) that used to operate in the area. The roundabout is located at the intersection of Section 17, Section 14, Section 19 and SS2. The roundabout has been synonymous with traffic congestion, especially during peak hours. In 2009, the roundabout was upgraded into a fourth junction.

List of junctions

References

Roads in Petaling Jaya